The Eby ministry is the combined Cabinet (formally the Executive Council of British Columbia) that has governed British Columbia since November 18, 2022. It is chaired by the 37th premier of British Columbia, David Eby. The Cabinet is made up of members of the British Columbia New Democratic Party (NDP), which commands a majority in the Legislative Assembly of British Columbia.

The ministry replaced the Horgan ministry after John Horgan stepped down as premier and NDP leader and Eby was selected to succeed him. Eby was sworn into office on November 18, 2022, and appointed his first cabinet on December 7, 2022.

List of ministers

Cabinet composition and shuffles 
After being sworn in on November 18, 2022, Eby announced his new cabinet on December 7, 2022. His cabinet consisted of 23 ministers and four ministers of state, and established two new ministries: a standalone Ministry of Housing and the Ministry of Emergency Management and Climate Readiness. Among the changes, former forests minister Katrine Conroy was named the new finance minister; Ravi Kahlon, former jobs minister and a close ally of Eby's, became the inaugural housing minister; Bowinn Ma, formerly minister of state for infrastructure, moved to the new emergency management ministry; and Niki Sharma, former parliamentary secretary for community development, was promoted to Attorney General. A total of eight ministers were elevated from parliamentary secretary or the backbenches — Sharma, Pam Alexis, Brenda Bailey, Jagrup Brar, Dan Coulter, Grace Lore, Andrew Mercier and Rachna Singh — while eight ministers kept the portfolios they held under Horgan: Harry Bains, Lisa Beare, Mitzi Dean, Adrian Dix, Mike Farnworth, Rob Fleming, George Heyman and Murray Rankin. After the shuffle, Eby's cabinet included more women than men.

Notes

References

Citations

Sources

External links 
 Executive Council & Parliamentary Secretaries of B.C.

Politics of British Columbia
Executive Council of British Columbia
2022 establishments in British Columbia
Cabinets established in 2022
Current governments
Ministries of Charles III